is a trilogy of Japanese adult visual novels developed by the visual novel company Leaf for the Microsoft Windows PC, and is the sequel to Leaf's earlier visual novel, White Album. The first part of the series, named White Album 2: Introductory Chapter, was released on March 26, 2010. 

The second part in the series is named White Album 2: Closing Chapter and was released on December 22, 2011. An all-ages PlayStation 3 version combining both chapters published by Aquaplus was released in 2012 and ported for PlayStation Vita in 2013. 

A White Album 2 - Mini-After Story epilogue was released for Windows in 2014. White Album 2: Extended Edition, combining both chapters and the epilogue was released in 2018, also for Windows. The gameplay of White Album 2 follows a linear plot line which offers pre-determined scenarios with courses of interaction. An anime television series adaptation aired in Japan between October and December 2013.

Gameplay

The gameplay in White Album 2 requires minimal interaction from the player as the player spends the majority of their time on reading the text that is displayed at the bottom of the screen. Unlike other visual novels, there is only one ending in Introductory Chapter and there are no choices for the player to select. 

The player's only interaction with the game during the "introductory chapter" and "mini after story" is to click a button to advance the game by rolling the next line of text onto the screen, while both "closing chapter" and "coda" requires comprehensive multiple choice questions to handle the trend of the plot development.

Plot

Settings
White Album 2 takes place in the same setting as its predecessor with approximately ten years having been elapsed since the events of the first White Album. Introductory Chapter begins during the second half of October. Closing Chapter begins three years after the events of Introductory Chapter.

Characters

 
The protagonist of White Album 2. He is a third year student at Hōjō High School and a member of the light music club and has excellent grades. He dates and loves Setsuna, but eventually Kazusa Touma shows her true feelings for him, and Haruki reveals that he loves her too. Haruki plays second guitar. A student with excellent grades, who's meddlesome and preachy. Lately he's been concentrating on practicing the guitar for the school festival, but he's not talented enough to go on stage.

 

Setsuna Ogiso is the first main heroine. She is the triggering of the plot and the only character with an important role in all the routes, even more than Haruki himself. Setsuna is a third year student at Hōjō High School and has been Miss Hōjō two years in a row and enjoys singing karaoke. She is beautiful and friendly when approached, yet places a wall between herself and others so she has no close friends. She refrains from making friends due to her troubled past during her years in middle school. However, she is this way precisely because she was consecutively voted as the prettiest girl in the school, and her classmates all expect her to be a fashionable, wealthy young lady.

 

Kazusa Touma is the second main  heroine. She is a third year student at Hōjō and is in the same class as Haruki. She often dozes off in, is late for, and skips class. She is a very talented pianist, and comes from a wealthy family. Kazusa is the daughter of a famous pianist, and a musical genius who dropped out of Hōjō's music division. She puts on a hostile and dismissive front towards Haruki, but is in truth in love with him before the events of the series begin. Once Haruki befriends her, she is a valuable ally for the cultural festival. When it comes to music, her passion and confidence is unrivaled.

 

Io is a classmate of Setsuna's and used to be the captain of the basketball team. Io was in the same class as Haruki during first year although the two of have known each other since junior high.

Takeya is a close friend of Haruki and is the president of the light music club. Takeya plays the guitar and is surprisingly popular with girls.

Story
The story of Introductory Chapter begins around the second half of October with Haruki Kitahara and Takeya Iizuka troubled over the fact that all the band members they gathered for the school festival have left. After a bit of hard work, Setsuna Ogiso and Kazusa Touma are recruited into the club. With Haruki, the three of them play together at the school festival. They perform Yuki Morikawa's "White Album", Rina Ogata's "Sound of Destiny", and an original song named "Todokanai Koi". When the day draws to an end, Setsuna finds Haruki and then confesses to him and the two of them start going out together.  From that point, the plot and feelings of the characters evolve. After Introductory Chapter, the story continues with "Closing Chapter", "Coda" (which was sold along with "Closing Chapter") and, at the end, "After Story", which completes the story as an epilogue. The story has been also expanded with CD Drama and novels.

Development
The director, artist, and character designer for White Album 2 is Takeshi Nakamura who had previously worked on Leaf's other games such as December When There Is No Angel and the PlayStation 3 port of Tears to Tiara. The scenario for White Album 2 is written by Fumiaki Maruto and Kikakuya. The pair has worked together before on other visual novels such as Kono Aozora ni Yakusoku o. The producer for White Album 2 is Naoya Shimokawa.

According to Shimokawa, Maruto was the one who came up with the original design and concept for White Album 2. After hearing the details from Maruto, Shimokawa felt that Maruto may be able to create a game that surpassed the original and decided to run with the idea. When Nakamura was told that he would be the artist for the game, he went to speak with Hisashi Kawata, the artist for the original White Album, Kawata stated that he wanted to see the painful winter images that Nakamura would create. 

Nakamura admits that because White Album 2 is a sequel that he does feel some pressure about the work. Despite being busy with Kimi ga Yobu, Megido no Oka de and the PlayStation 3's Tears to Tiara, Nakamura went ahead and created the character designs for the game even though no one had asked him for them.

When asked about the release date of the second part of the game, Shimokawa stated that it would be nice to release it some time during the winter season to align with the feelings that the title "White Album" evokes. Shimokawa believes that the scenario should be all complete by then and that it would come down to whether the art is completed in time or not. Unlike December When There is No Angel where there were two artists, Nakamura is alone this time and has to work on both the heroines and the supporting characters, making it a rather big effort.

Release history
A preorder campaign for Introductory Chapter began on September 25, 2009. Preorders that were received within an unspecified time period received a chibi model figure of Setsuna Ogiso. Both the limited and regular editions of Introductory Chapter was originally planned to be released on February 26, 2010 but it was delayed, Introductory Chapter officially went gold on March 12, 2010 and was then released two weeks later on March 26, 2010. The limited edition of the game includes a hardcover novel with it. The novel is named , and was written by Maruto and illustrated by Nakamura. The novel that comes with Introductory Chapter is told from a different perspective. The novel that comes with Closing Chapter is a story set between the events of Introductory Chapter and the second game. Closing Chapter was released on December 22, 2011.

Adaptations

Drama CD
A drama CD titled  was released on August 13, 2010 during Comiket 78. The script was written by Fumiaki Maruto and the illustrations were done by Takeshi Nakamura. A short novel was also included in the drama CD. The premise of the drama CD was about the day before the school festival. Haruki Kitahara, Setsuna Ogiso, and Kazusa Touma are voiced by Takahiro Mizushima, Madoka Yonezawa, and Hitomi Nabatame respectively. After the release of the game, other drama CD have been published.

Print
A light novel adaptation began releasing on March 16, 2013 under the title . The light novels were written by Masaya Tsukishima and illustrated by Takeshi Nakamura and Keiichirō Katsura. The series completed on September 12, 2014, with six volumes.

A manga adaptation was created and illustrated by 2C=Galore. The manga began serialization on July 11, 2013 in the GA Bunko Magazine and was compiled into four volumes.

Anime
A 13-episode television series anime adaptation of White Album 2 was announced in the May 2013 issue of Kadokawa Shoten's Monthly Newtype magazine. Masaomi Ando directed the series at studio Satelight. Fumiaki Maruto, the scenario writer for the original games, supervised and wrote the series' scripts and composer Naoya Shimokawa served as the music producer for the anime. It adapted White Album 2: Introductory Chapter. The series aired in Japan between October 5 and December 28, 2013, on Tokyo MX and on MBS, TVA, BS11 and AT-X later. Crunchyroll streamed the series with English subtitles.

Music
Introductory Chapter has three theme songs, the opening theme , the ending theme "Twinkle Snow", and the insert song . Both the opening theme and insert song is sung by Rena Uehara. The ending theme is performed by Akari Tsuda. Shinya Ishikawa composed both "Todokanai Koi" and "After All: Tsuduru Omoi" while Junya Matsuoka composed "Twinkle Snow". 

Matsuoka handled the arrangement of "Todokanai Koi" and Michio Kinugasa arranged "Twinkle Snow" and "After All: Tsuduru Omoi". A CD single containing all three songs was released on May 26, 2010. The single peaked at 65th place in Oricon's rankings for one week.

White Album 2's soundtrack has been deeply praised, along with its connection with the plot. The soundtrack is composed by different composers, such as Naoya Shimokawa, Shinya Ishikawa and Michio Kinugasa, with songs sung by Madoka Yonezawa (Setsuna Ogiso), Rena Uehara and Tsuda Akari. In addition, many CD's with different versions of the songs have been released since White Album 2: Introductory Chapter and Closing Chapter were released.

In 2017, a CD called "White Album 2: Soundtrack ~Kazusa~" was released, with songs of the visual novel sung by Kazusa Touma (Hitomi Nabatame), one of the heroines of the game.

The opening theme to Closing Chapter, was also sung by Rena Uehara.

Reception
Introductory Chapter tied for second place in bishōjo game preorders in Japan between the months of December 2009 and January 2010. It was the second most widely sold PC game in March 2010 on Getchu.com. According to Polygon, Famitsu gave White Album 2 (PS3 version) a 37/40, being the top scorer of the week and beating New Super Mario Bros. U.

References

External links

Official website of Introductory Chapter 
Official website of Closing Chapter 
Anime's official website 

2010 video games
2011 video games
Bishōjo games
Eroge
GA Bunko
Japan-exclusive video games
Medialink
Music in anime and manga
PlayStation 3 games
PlayStation Vita games
Romance anime and manga
Romance video games
Satelight
Video games developed in Japan
Video game sequels
Visual novels
Windows games
Aquaplus games